HMS Cormorant  was a  wooden paddle sloop of the Royal Navy that operated from 1843 to 1853.

References

 

 

Paddle sloops of the Royal Navy
Sloops of the Royal Navy
1842 ships